Sugar Aloes, (born Michael Anthony Osouna ) is a calypsonian from Trinidad and Tobago whose songs include "Party Time" and  "Juanita", "I Love Being Me" and "Signs of the end of Time". In February 2008, Sugar Aloes was the winner of the Calypso Monarch 2008 Competition at Queens Park Oval in Port-of-Spain, Trinidad. He won this competition singing a song entitled "Reflections". In this song, he made some sarcastic remarks about government, which maintained a certain degree of humor.

References

External links
 "Sugar Aloes", Trinidad and Tobago Directory
 "Sugar Aloes", Best of trinidad

Living people
Year of birth missing (living people)
Calypsonians
21st-century Trinidad and Tobago male singers
21st-century Trinidad and Tobago singers